High on Life may refer to:
 High on Life (video game), published by Squanch Games
 "High on Life" (song), by Martin Garrix featuring Bonn.
 High on Life, an exhibition at American Visionary Art Museum
 High on Life, an album by QFX
 "High on Life", a song by Christopher from Told You So
 "High on Life", a song by Darius Rucker from Southern Style
 "High on Life", a song by Def Tech from Def Tech
 "High on Life", a song by DJ Encore feat. Engelina
 "High on Life", a song by DJ Force & The Evolution 
 "High on Life", a song by Kwesta feat. Tia Black from DaKAR
 "High on Life", a song by Rasputina from Frustration Plantation
 "High on Life", a song by Rebelution from Falling into Place
 "High on Life", a song by Shalamar from Uptown Festival
 "High on Life", a song by Gene Vincent from The Day the World Turned Blue
 High on Life, a fictional band in National Lampoon's Senior Trip

See also
 High life (disambiguation)